FK TSC Bačka Topola, commonly known as TSC, is a Serbian professional football club based in Bačka Topola and currently the second oldest football club in the Serbian SuperLiga.

Name changes 
1913 – 1930: Topolyai Sport Club
1930 – 1942: Jugoslovenski Atletski Klub Bačka Topola
1942 – 1945: Topolyai SE
1945 – 1951: FK Egység
1951 – 1974: FK Topola
1974 – 2005: FK AIK Bačka Topola
2005 – 2013: FK Bačka Topola
2013 – present: FK TSC Bačka Topola

History 

The first football club formed in Bačka Topola in 1912, the club officially exists since 1913 and was founded by István Benis who was the first president of the club. It was named Topolyai Sport Club. The town belonged back then to the Austro-Hungarian Empire. The first club sponsor was Károly Beer who also brought the first football to the town. Soon the First World War started and after the war the region of Bačka would become part of the Kingdom of Serbs, Croats and Slovenes, renamed into Yugoslavia in 1929. In 1930, the club changed its name into Jugoslovenski Atletski Klub. In the early 1930s, the stadium where the club still plays nowadays was built. In the Second World War the club competes in the Hungarian Second League, finishing in second place in 1942.

After the war the region returned to Yugoslavia, and the club was renamed Egység, and counted with Hungarian international Jenő Kalmár among its strongest reinforcements. In 1951, the club changes its name again into Topola. The club played in the Subotica regional league and later achieved promotion to the Serbian League (3rd Yugoslav tier).

In 1974, the club change its name into FK AIK Bačka Topola. In 1980, AIK was promoted to the Yugoslav Second League, and in the next 6 years competed 5 seasons in the second highest division. In the Yugoslavian Cup competition of the season 1992–93 they entered the 1/8 finals after a win against the First League club Napredak Kruševac 2–1.

In 2003, the club under financial difficulties ceases to compete, and maintains only the youth levels. In 2005, the club is merged with FK Bajša and starts competing again under a new name, FK Bačka Topola. The club was the champion of the Vojvodina League North in the 2006–07 season. The club has dedicated much effort in the youth squads archiving titles in several levels. The club finished the 2010–11 season in second place, and won the relegation game for the Third League. In 2013, the official name was changed to FK TSC Bačka Topola. On 15 October 2013, the club's anniversary day, TSC played against FK Partizan (1–4). The club finished the season 2013–14 in second place, and lost the promotion play-off game for the Third League after a penalty shootout (2–2, 2–2) against FK Cement Beočin. In 2014–2015, TSC won the Bačka League, and returned to the Serbian League Vojvodina, national third tier.

The club finished the 2016–17 Serbian League Vojvodina in third place, but got promoted to the Serbian First League. From the Serbian second tier, they were for the first time ever promoted to the Serbian SuperLiga for season 2019–20. There in their first ever top flight match away to FK Voždovac in Belgrade, playing at the modern shopping centre stadium, TSC won 1–2, marking a fine debut and the brightest moment in the club's history. The club finished 4th in their first season in the SuperLiga and qualified for the first qualifying round of the 2020-21 UEFA Europa League. Throughout the club's debut season strikers Nenad Lukić and Vladimir Silađi were impressive, finishing the season as triple joint top scorers. Other impressive players in the season for TSC were Janko Tumbasević, Goran Antonić, Saša Tomanović, Srđan Grabež and Đuro Zec. Under manager Zoltán Szabó the club recorded its most significant/highest result in its history of 4th place and its first foray into European Football, the UEFA Europa League.

Club colors and crest 
The club's original colors were green and white, but later replaced by blue. The lion on the crest is the coat of arms of Bačka Topola, which comes from the coat of arms of Pál Kray who was a nobleman in the town in 18th century.

Stadium 
The home field of TSC was the City Stadium, which held 4,000 people. Construction of the stadium was finished in the 1930s. In 2017, TSC announced its intentions to build a new 4,500-seat stadium. From the 2018–19 to the 2021–22 season, because of the construction of the new stadium, the club's home games were played in City Stadium in Senta. On 3 September 2021 the TSC Arena was opened by the match against Ferencváros.

The official supporters group of the club is the Blue Betyárs.

Squads from club's seasons in Yugoslav Second League
1980–81 Yugoslav Second League 8th place – players, apps/goals: Đura Stanimirović 29, Milan Agbaba 26/4, Radomir Bošković 26, Radomir Bošnjak 25, Radoslav Brkić 25, Aleksandar Krivokapić 24/6, Miklós Ország (captain) 24/2, Antun Patarčić 23, Nikola Lukić 22/16, Božidar Perović 21, Milan Rubin 20/2, Sándor Sz. Kovács 18/1, Laszló Lőrinc 16, Zlatko Majer 15, Menhard Verebes 15, Antal Szalma 14, Imre Futó 12/1 Milorad Sekulović 11/4, Zdravko Savić 10/1 Nenad Bakić 6, Nenad Bilbija 4, Rešad Kazaferović 1

1981–82 Yugoslav Second League 10th place – players, apps/goals: Miklós Ország (captain) 28, Róbert Kovács 27/2, Nikola Lukić 25/11, Radomir Bošnjak 25, Zdravko Savić 22/5, Aleksandar Krivokapić 21/5, Milan Agbaba 20/4, Zoran Mihović 19, Radomir Bošković 18/1, Nenad Bakić 18, Milan Rubin 17, Antun Patarčić 14, Imre Futó 14, Dejan Mitić 13/6, Milan Banjeglav 13, László Lőrinc 12/1, László Dudás 11, Menhard Verebes 11, Antal Szalma 10, Nebojša Knežević 10, Sándor Sz. Kovács 9, Miroslav Zagorčić 6/1, Dejan Smiljanić 3, Milorad Sekulović 2/1, Sándor I. Kovács 2, Božidar Perović 1, Nándor Rekecki 1, Zoltán Koščić 1

1982–83 Yugoslav Second League 14th place

1983–84 Yugoslav Second League 16th place (relegated) – players, apps/goals: Róbert Kovács 32, Veselin Barjakterević 31, Radomir Bošković 30/4, Dragan Jablan 28/7, Radomir Bošnjak 26/3, Mikloš Narandžić 25, Nenad Bakić 25, Milan Agbaba 24/7, Miklós Ország (captain) 24, Zdravko Savić 21/5, Zlatko Majer 19/1, Nebojša Knežević 19/1, Zoran Mihović 18, Milan Banjeglav 18, Antun Patarčić 18, Labud Pejović 16/6, Árpád Eper 16/3, Aleksandar Krivokapić 15/2, Tihomir Pavićević 15, Dragoljub Bekvalac 11/1, Dejan Mitić 4, Bogdan Kosovac 2, László Dudás 1, Nándor Rekecki 1

1985–86 Yugoslav Second League 15th place (relegated)

Honours

Domestic 

 Serbian First League
  Champions (1): 2018–19

Players

Current squad

Out on loan

European record

Club officials
{| class="wikitable"
|-  style="text-align:center;background:#0000FF; color:black; border-top:black 3px solid; border-bottom:black 3px solid;"
| COLSPAN="14" | <span style="color:white;">Current technical staff</span>
|-  style="text-align:center; background:#ddffdd;"
!Position
!Name
|-
|-
|Manager||  Žarko Lazetić   
|-
|Assistant manager||  Dražen Bolić 
|-
|Goalkeeper coach||   Szilárd Faragó 
|-
|Data analyst||  Krsto Jokić 
|-
|Fitness coach||  Veselin Sekulović 
|-
|Sports director||  Mirko Jovanović 
|-
|Physiotherapist|| Dragan Golubović 
|-
|General secretary||  Radomir Šaban 
|-
| colspan="2" | Source': 
|}

Notable players

The following players played for national teams:
  Slobodan Batričević
  Jenő Kalmár
  Andrija Kaluđerović
  Nikica Klinčarski
  Norbert Könyves
  Zlatko Krmpotić
  Savo Pavićević
  Dušan Tadić
  Janko Tumbasević
  Nikola Žigić

Other professional footballers:
  Dragoljub Bekvalac
  Ištvan Dudaš
  Viktor Orsag
  Čedomir Pavičević
  Mitar Peković
  Tamás Takács
  Zvezdan Terzić
  Nenad Todorović
  Vladimir Silađi
  Nenad LukićFor the list of current and former players with Wikipedia article, please see: :Category:FK TSC Bačka Topola players.''

References

External sources
 Official website
 TSC at National-football-teams
 TSC at Srbijasport

FK TSC Bačka Topola
Football clubs in Serbia
Football clubs in Vojvodina
Association football clubs established in 1913
1913 establishments in Serbia